MTV Big F is a television anthology series broadcast by MTV India. It premiered on 11 October 2015, every Sunday. The show brings Gautam Gulati as host and set to deal with youngster's forbidden fantasies  by showcasing stories of youngsters in each episode. The second season was hosted by Bollywood actor Randeep Hooda which primarily revolves around the psyche of Indian women to explore their hidden desires.

Host 
 Gautam Gulati - Season 1 (13 episodes)
 Randeep Hooda - Season 2 (13 episodes)

Cast 
Main Leads

Season 1

Season 2

References

External links

MTV (Indian TV channel) original programming
2015 Indian television series debuts
2016 Indian television series endings
Indian drama television series
Hindi-language television shows
Indian anthology television series
Indian LGBT-related television shows